John Skerrett (Mayor) was the 7th Mayor of Galway, serving 1491–1492. Skerrett was a member of one of The Tribes of Galway, descended from a Richard Huskard. John Skerrett was elected Provost of Galway in 1480. A copy of his mayoralty seal survives, and was illustrated in volume one of Blake Family Records by Martin J. Blake.

References 
 Henry, William (2002). Role of Honour: The Mayors of Galway City 1485–2001. Galway: Galway City Council.   
 Martyn, Adrian, The Tribes of Galway:1124–1642, Galway, 2016. 

15th-century Irish politicians
Mayors of Galway